A Pentatonix Christmas is the fifth studio album by American a cappella group Pentatonix. It is also their second full-length holiday album since That's Christmas to Me in 2014. Featuring two new original songs, "Good to Be Bad" and "The Christmas Sing-Along", A Pentatonix Christmas debuted on the Billboard 200 at number three with 52,000 albums sold in its first week, and later peaked at number one, selling 206,000 units in its best week. A Pentatonix Christmas marks as their second number one album on the Billboard 200 after Pentatonix. The album also debuted atop the Billboard Holiday Albums chart, their second number one on that chart after That's Christmas to Me. The deluxe edition of the album dropped from number 6 to 200 on the Billboard 200 in 2018, the greatest drop for an album that still remained on the chart, in Billboard history.  The album also, with a guest appearance by The Manhattan Transfer, marked the first recording by the fourth iteration of the group, as this was Trist Curless' first participation with the group in a recording since the death of Tim Hauser, whom Curless officially replaced in 2014.

As of November 2017, 938,000 units of A Pentatonix Christmas have been sold in the US and 1,400,000 units worldwide. A deluxe edition was released on October 20, 2017, almost a year after the original's release. The deluxe edition additionally marks the first appearance of replacement bass Matt Sallee and the second to last appearance of Avi Kaplan.

Track listing

Personnel
Credits adapted from AllMusic.

Pentatonix
 Scott Hoying – baritone lead, backing vocals, co-vocal bass on "Hallelujah”
 Mitch Grassi – tenor lead and backing vocals 
 Kirstin Maldonado – alto lead and backing vocals
 Avi Kaplan – vocal bass, bass lead and backing vocals
 Kevin "K.O." Olusola – vocal percussion, beatboxing, tenor backing vocals, vocal flugelhorn on "Good To Be Bad", lead vocals on "Away in a Manger"

Additional personnel

 The Manhattan Transfer – choir/chorus
 Kala Batch – choir/chorus
 Ed Boyer – mixing
 Ben Bram – arranger, engineer, production
 Jacob Collier – contractor, arranger
 Jessi Collins – choir/chorus
 Tim Davis – contractor, engineer
 Luke Edgemon – choir/chorus
 Anthony Evans – choir/chorus
 Alex Green – production
 Missi Hale – choir/chorus
 Bill Hare – mastering
 Andrew Kesler – production
 Keri Larson – choir/chorus
 David Laucks – choir/chorus
 Shang-Po Lin – engineering
 Toby Lin – engineering assistance
 Keith Noftary – A&R
 Tiffany Palmer – choir/chorus
 Brandon Winbush – choir/chorus
 Mick Wordley – engineering

Deluxe edition 
 Matt Sallee - vocal bass, bass backing vocals
 Reno Selmser - vocal bass, bass backing vocals (on "Let It Snow")

Charts

Weekly charts

Year-end charts

Decade-end charts

Certifications

See also 
 List of Billboard Top Holiday Albums number ones of the 2010s

References

2016 Christmas albums
Pentatonix albums
A cappella Christmas albums
Christmas albums by American artists
RCA Records Christmas albums